Wanderlei César da Silva (born 3 July 1976) is a Brazilian-American former mixed martial artist who competed in Japan's Pride Fighting Championships and the American-based Ultimate Fighting Championship (UFC). He holds the record for the most wins, knockouts, title defenses and longest winning streak in PRIDE history. He is the former PRIDE Middleweight Champion and the 2003 PRIDE Middleweight Grand Prix Tournament Champion. He most recently competed for Bellator MMA in the light heavyweight and heavyweight divisions.

Mixed martial arts career

Early career
Silva's aggressive style is rooted in street brawling, refined with elements of Muay Thai and kickboxing, which he began learning at the age of 13 in Chute Boxe Academy in his hometown Curitiba. In his late teens he joined the Brazilian army and was quickly recognized for his fighting talents. He was asked to join Vale Tudo and Brazilian jiu-jitsu school. Silva enlisted after already winning fight tournaments in his age group in Brazil. Silva developed scar tissue around his eyes from fighting in bare-knuckle vale tudo.

Silva's first professional match was on 1 November 1996, in the bare-knuckle Brazilian Vale Tudo Fighting organization (BVF), where he knocked out Dilson Filho via right elbow at BVF 6. He fought in one other match in BVF, BVF 10 on 1 July 1997, against Marcelo Barbosa, who submitted due to a shoulder injury.

Silva fought six matches in four different International Vale Tudo Championship events, IVC 2, IVC 6, IVC 9 and IVC 10, from 1997 to 1999. He won five of these matches by KO/TKO, with his one loss being the result of a cut stoppage against Artur Mariano in the IVC 2 show on 15 September 1997. Though Silva dominated Mariano with punches and knee strikes, the cut was above Silva's left eyelid and opened back up several times, partially because Silva continued to use the cut side of his head to inflict many headbutts on Mariano over the course of the match. The doctor observed the cut several times before the fight was ended.

Silva culminated his IVC career by winning the promotion's Cruiserweight belt with a submission win over Eugene Jackson in the IVC 10 show on 27 April 1999. It was after this fight that Silva earned the nickname "The Axe Murderer".

Silva participated in one Meca World Vale Tudo event, Meca 2 on 12 August 2000, where he knocked out Todd Medina with Muay Thai knees.

Ultimate Fighting Championship
Silva entered the UFC on 16 October 1998, at UFC Brazil: Ultimate Brazil, in a match against Vitor Belfort. The match was arguably the worst defeat of his career, lasting only 44 seconds and ending with Silva being knocked down against the cage by Belfort's punches then being stopped by the referee. Silva won his next UFC match on 7 May 1999, at UFC 20, in which he knocked out Tony Petarra with knees. On 14 April 2000, Silva fought for the UFC Light Heavyweight Championship, but lost via unanimous decision to Tito Ortiz at UFC 25.

Pride Fighting championships
Silva debuted in PRIDE at the Pride 7 event on 12 September 1999, against Carl Ognibene (better known as Carl "Malenko"). Silva used his strength to control Malenko from the ground, demonstrating his grappling expertise, coming very close to securing a guillotine choke and a rear-naked choke during round one, in addition to landing many powerful knees from the clinch. Silva continued to dominate Malenko en route to a decision victory. This dominance would set the tone for Silva's career in the organization. From 1999 to 2004, Silva won eighteen-straight fights in PRIDE, excluding a draw against Mirko Cro Cop (under slightly modified rules in which if the match would go to the time limit, the bout would be declared a draw) and a no contest against Gilbert Yvel (Silva accidentally kicked Yvel in the groin), giving him a twenty-fight unbeaten streak. Silva's reputation as a formidable MMA fighter grew as he developed a successful 5-year win record in the middle weight division (205 lb) of Pride.

Silva fought Japanese superstar Kazushi Sakuraba for the first time at Pride 13 - Collision Course on 25 March 2001. Silva won via TKO (knees and soccer kick) at 1:38 into the first round. At Pride 17: Championship Chaos on 3 November 2001, Silva won the inaugural Pride middleweight (205 lb) championship when he defeated Sakuraba for the second time. Sakuraba suffered a broken clavicle and was forced to withdraw after the first round, giving Silva a TKO win via doctor's stoppage. The two fought for a third time on 10 August 2003 at Pride Total Elimination 2003, part of the PRIDE Middleweight Tournament. Silva knocked out Sakuraba with a two punch combination at 5:01 into the first round.

Silva faced Quinton "Rampage" Jackson at Pride Final Conflict 2003 on 9 November 2003. Silva won by TKO after delivering seventeen consecutive knees to Jackson. Silva became Pride's 2003 tournament champion with the win. The two fought again on 31 October 2004 at Pride 28: High Octane. Jackson knocked Silva down near the end of the first round and mounted him as the bell rang. In round two Silva caught Jackson with a counter right hand and followed up with knees from the thai clinch knocking Jackson out, successfully defending the Pride middleweight championship with the win.  In Japan, Silva additionally gained his reputation as a fighter who has never been defeated by any Japanese opponent, resulting in a trend of various Japanese fighters being arranged by Pride to face him.

Silva's undefeated 5-year streak (18 wins, 13 knockouts) in PRIDE was broken by Samoan Heavyweight Mark Hunt, a K-1 champion on 31 December 2004 at the Pride Shockwave 2004 event. Hunt won the non-title match by split decision. The decision was controversial because some who felt that Hunt's weight of 280 lb (125 kg), over 80 lb more than Silva, as well as Silva's performance in rounds two and three, had not been sufficiently considered by the judges in their decision; Randy Couture and Bas Rutten, both being commentators at the event, expressed disagreement with the judges decision. Silva also took this fight on two days notice. Nonetheless, Silva's 2004 campaign earned him Fighter of the Year honors from both Sherdog and the Wrestling Observer Newsletter.

Silva's former status as PRIDE Middleweight Champion first came under debate and criticism with his loss to Ricardo Arona (who subsequently lost the tournament to Silva's teammate, Mauricio "Shogun" Rua) on 28 August 2005 at Pride Final Conflict 2005. The loss, by unanimous decision in the tournament's semi-finals, was Silva's first defeat in a middleweight match in Pride; however, since it was not a title fight and held under special rules due to the grand prix format (2 rounds instead of 3), Silva was still recognized as the middleweight champion.

A rematch between Arona and Silva was scheduled to take place at the Pride Shockwave 2005 event on 31 December 2005. Mere minutes before the fight, Silva's teammate Cristiano Marcello had choked Charles Bennett unconscious in the locker room after a confrontation. Waking up, Bennett struck Silva with an elbow strike knocking him down unconscious. Despite the incident, Silva went on to win the fight by split decision.

On 18 May 2006, Pride's parent company, Dream Stage Entertainment (DSE), announced that Silva would replace Pride heavyweight champion Fedor Emelianenko in the Open Weight Grand Prix. Emelianenko's doctors stated that his hand, which had recently undergone surgery, would not be in good enough shape to fight because the metal implant would still be present. Because Silva was also a champion, he received a first round bye and fought in the second round at Pride Critical Countdown Absolute, which took place on 1 July 2006. Silva moved to the semi-finals of the Open Weight Grand Prix after defeating Kazuyuki Fujita by TKO (punches and soccer kicks) at 9:21 of round one.

On 8 July 2006, at UFC 61: Bitter Rivals, UFC president Dana White announced Silva would face Chuck Liddell in a UFC event held in November, provided Liddell beat Renato "Babalu" Sobral at UFC 62. Liddell did end up winning that fight. However, talks dwindled and the fight as advertised did not happen.

On 10 September 2006, at Pride Final Conflict Absolute, Wanderlei Silva was knocked out by Mirko Cro Cop in their rematch during the Heavyweight Grand Prix semi-finals. After a brief stoppage to tend to a swollen eye on Silva, "Cro Cop" struck Silva in the head with a left kick, knocking him out. On 21 October 2006 at Pride 32: The Real Deal, Wanderlei issued his challenge to Chuck Liddell to a fight inside a Pride ring in February, when the promotion returned to Las Vegas, however Dana White stated that the fight would not be happening, citing Silva's recent KO loss to Mirko Cro Cop which would have not allowed the NSAC to clear him medically for the fight that soon after being knocked out.

Silva put his Pride middleweight title on the line against Dan Henderson, Pride's welterweight (183 lb) champion at Pride 33: The Second Coming, held on 24 February 2007, in Las Vegas, Nevada. In a night of upsets, Henderson knocked out Silva in the third round with a left hook to become the new middleweight champion. Silva was denied the ability to participate in Pride 34 due to medical suspension by the Nevada State Athletic Commission (NSAC) which made this his last Pride appearance. Silva almost never lost under pure Pride rules at 205 pounds.

Return to the UFC

On 17 August 2007, the UFC announced that they had signed Wanderlei Silva to compete in the organization and that he would return to the Octagon on 29 December 2007 at UFC 79. After months of speculation about Silva's opponent, UFC President Dana White announced that Chuck Liddell would be Silva's opponent for his return match. The long-awaited match happened on 29 December 2007 at UFC 79 with Silva losing to Liddell by unanimous decision. After the fight Silva said, "Win or lose I like to give the emotion for my fans" He also added that he gave his best and promised that next time he will deliver a win.

Keeping to his promise, on 24 May 2008 at UFC 84 in Las Vegas, he earned a decisive KO win against Keith Jardine at the 36-second mark of the first round, earning him Knockout of the Night honors. When Jardine threw a kick, Silva countered with a right-left-right combo that dropped him. Silva then finished the fight with ground strikes to earn the knockout.

At UFC 92, Wanderlei fought Quinton Jackson, who he had beaten twice previously in PRIDE. Jackson avenged his previous defeats by knocking Silva out with a left hook in the first round. Following the fight, Silva indicated that he would like to face Jackson again in the future.

Silva faced Rich Franklin at UFC 99 at a catchweight bout of 195 lb. After a hard-fought match on both sides, Silva lost via unanimous decision to Franklin. During the second round, Silva rocked Franklin hard with punches and almost finished the fight during that moment. This was counterbalanced by Franklin dropping Silva three times in that round, each time with singular strikes. Silva then announced he would be out of action until 2010, as he underwent facial surgery to repair his nose (which was broken during Silva's second fight with Cro Cop, and then repeatedly broken again in later matches) and remove some scar tissue from above his eyes to avoid bleeding and being easily cut open during future fights. The surgery allowed him to breathe through a once completely blocked nose thus increasing his oxygen intake by 30% by doctor's estimates. At UFC 110, announcer Joe Rogan emphatically stated that Wanderlei looked like a totally different person in the wake of his recent facial reconstructive surgery.

Silva made his middleweight (185 lb) debut during UFC 110 against Michael Bisping on 21 February 2010. During the fight Bisping was able to take Silva down several times during the first round, however Wanderlei came back with a flurry of punches at the end of the first round, a tight guillotine choke in the second, and a right hook that dropped Bisping in the third. After three rounds of fighting, Silva was awarded the unanimous decision victory (29–28, 29–28, and 29–28) and his first victory in almost two years. Although winning only one of his previous 6 bouts, he was slightly favored going into the fight as it was widely speculated that Bisping was apprehensive to fight toe-to-toe after being viciously knocked out by Dan Henderson on 11 July 2009 in UFC 100. After the fight, an emotional Silva told the audience, "In your life you have bad moments. Everybody has bad moments, but if you believe in God and working hard, good moments they’ll come". Silva attributed his success to working with his previous trainer Raphael Cordeiro. Bisping added, "Wanderlei's a great opponent ... I felt the reason he got the decision was the knockdown right at the end".

Silva was expected to face former K-1 HERO'S Light heavyweight Champion Yoshihiro Akiyama at UFC 116. However, on 22 June, Silva had to pull out due to breaking three ribs during training. Akiyama would instead be fighting on the card, against Chris Leben.  After Leben defeated Akiyama with a triangle choke in the third round Leben verbally called out Silva saying "Come on Wanderlei, I'll take you out too" in his post fight interview. "He represented very well, he's a good opponent," said Silva of "The Crippler." "I think if he's gonna wait that I'm gonna fight him next however Dana White has not considered a Silva/Leben fight happening anytime soon."

Silva underwent knee surgery in late July 2010 and his doctors had stated that he would need to wait at least 4 months before returning to training.  This meant that he would not be seen fighting in the octagon again until early 2011.

Silva was scheduled to face Brian Stann at UFC 130. However, after Silva voiced his reluctance to face Stann, he was replaced on the card by returning UFC veteran Jorge Santiago.

On 4 April 2011, the UFC announced that Silva's next opponent would be Chris Leben with the two scheduled to meet at UFC 132. on 2 July 2011. During the fight's first round Leben won by KO with several uppercuts before following Silva to the ground for a referees stoppage at the 27 second mark. When Dana White was asked about his thoughts on Wanderlei's possible retirement, he said he felt it would be the best time for Wanderlei to retire but in the end it is up to whether Wanderlei himself would like to fight again.

Silva would fight again after replacing an injured Vitor Belfort against former Strikeforce Middleweight champion Cung Le at UFC 139. Le managed to confuse Silva with his unorthodox kicks, and landed a spinning backfist that dropped Silva. During the second round, Silva managed to shake Le with huge punches and knees that completely broke Le's nose. Le was stunned, bloody and fell to the ground, and the fight was stopped by the referee. Afterwards in the press conference, Dana White commented that it was a good stoppage and that Cung was taken to the hospital.

Silva and Vitor Belfort coached The Ultimate Fighter: Brazil  A rematch with Belfort was expected to take place on 23 June 2012 at UFC 147 but due to a broken hand Vitor Belfort had to withdraw from the match.

Silva faced Rich Franklin in a 190 lb catchweight at the event. Franklin and Silva fought once before at UFC 99, where Franklin won via unanimous decision.  Despite Silva nearly finishing Franklin in the second round, the result was the same when the pair met for a second time at UFC 147, where Franklin again won by unanimous decision 49–46.

In an interview with Sherdog asking about his future, Silva said: "I want to either fight a catchweight bout at 198 pounds (90 kg) or at light heavyweight. At middleweight, I'm very hungry (laughs). Right now, I'm doing weight training and some shadow boxing. I'm kind of on vacation now, paying attention to the family, but next year the Wand is back."

Silva faced Brian Stann in a Light heavyweight bout on 3 March 2013 at UFC on Fuel TV 8. The fight was notable as it was Silva's return to the Saitama Super Arena, where Pride FC ran the majority of its shows. Silva defeated Stann via KO in the second round in a bout that featured back and forth action, and earned both participants Fight of the Night honors.

On 22 October 2013, it was announced that Silva will be coaching The Ultimate Fighter: Brazil 3, against long-time rival Chael Sonnen.  A bout with Sonnen, briefly attached to UFC 173, then at The Ultimate Fighter: Brazil 3 Finale, was expected to take place on 5 July 2014 at UFC 175. Dana White later stated the fight had to be moved back when Silva injured his hand and back during a brawl with Sonnen that took place during filming of the show. Silva was ultimately pulled from the fight entirely after he failed to submit an application to fight in the state of Nevada, as well as his refusal to undergo a random drug test and was replaced by Vitor Belfort.
On 10 June 2014, it was later reported that Chael Sonnen failed a drug test and would not be allowed to fight on UFC 175 card, as a result of the failed drug test, Sonnen announced his retirement from the sport the following day. As a result of his refusal to submit to the drug tests, Silva was given a lifetime ban and a $70,000 fine by the Nevada State Athletic Commission at their meeting on 23 September 2014.

In May 2015, judge Kerry Earley overturned the lifetime ban that was imposed on Wanderlei Silva by the Nevada State Athletic Commission.

In January 2016, following an apology to the UFC about their "fight-fixed" [a.k.a. fight fixing] and retracting his statement, he was released from his UFC contract. This allowed  him to do whatever he wanted with his career.

Rizin FF
Subsequent to his ban, Silva competed in a tag team grappling match with Kiyoshi Tamura against former opponent Kazushi Sakuraba and Hideo Tokoro at an event on 17 April 2016 for startup regional promotion Rizin Fighting Federation. The official result of the match was deemed a draw.

In July 2016, it was announced that Silva would return to mixed martial arts competition in Japan as part of Rizin's 16-man openweight tournament beginning 25 September 2016 in Tokyo. Silva was scheduled to face Mirko Cro Cop in a trilogy bout on 29 December in the Rizin Open Weight quarter finals. However, on 2 December, Silva withdrew from the bout citing injury.

Bellator MMA
In early March 2016, Bellator MMA announced that Silva had signed a multi-fight contract with the organization. The previous lifetime ban handed down by the Nevada State Athletic Commission was reduced to a three-year suspension retroactive to 24 May 2014. He was eligible for reinstatement beginning 25 May 2017. The ban would not prevent Silva from competing at Indian Casinos or in Japan.

After four years away from the sport, Silva made his delayed Bellator debut against Chael Sonnen in the main event at Bellator NYC on 24 June 2017. Silva lost a unanimous decision.

On 25 June 2018, Bellator MMA announced that Silva would face Rampage Jackson in a fourth match on 29 September 2018 at Bellator 206. He lost the fight via technical knockout in round two.

On 29 September 2019, news surfaced that Silva's contract with Bellator had expired.

On September 1, 2022 Silva officially announced his retirement from MMA, expressing interest in boxing, calling out Dan Henderson.

Fighting style
Silva was famous for his brawling, relentless style of Muay Thai, which was described as being "feral" and carrying "a terrifying ferocity". His main strength was his offensive striking and use of hooks, soccer kicks and stomps. Silva was also willing to absorb counters in order to continue landing his own hits. He was also dangerous in the clinch, utilizing an onslaught of short hooks and knee strikes. Silva was also known for his use of headbutts when the rules allowed. Though his grappling expertise was initially considered inferior to his striking skills due to his preference for ground and pound, he had a refined Brazilian jiu-jitsu transitional game.

Personal life
Silva and his wife have a son, Thor. He has a daughter from a previous relationship.

On 26 August 2012 Silva's father, Holando Pinheiro da Silva, died in a car accident in Brazil.

In April 2016, Silva became an American citizen.

After years of living in the United States, Silva moved back to his hometown, Curitiba in Brazil.

In 2018, Silva admitted that he has been bearing symptoms consistent with chronic traumatic encephalopathy, and has expressed a wish to donate his brain for research.

On 8 October 2020, Sem Coleira, a Portuguese biography book about Silva was published.

Wand Fight Team
Wand Fight Team is a mixed martial arts training organization headed by Wanderlei Silva. It was founded in 2009 in Las Vegas, with a former franchise in Pensacola, Florida.

The Las Vegas location features several famous MMA Instructors, including, Leandro Lorenco (BJJ), Michael Costa (Muay Thai & MMA), Pete Martin (Kids Wrestling & Fitness) and Erik Perez (Fitness).

Championships and accomplishments

Mixed martial arts
Ultimate Fighting Championship
Fight of the Night (Five times)
Knockout of the Night (Two times)
Pride Fighting Championships
Pride Middleweight Championship (One time, first)
2003 Pride Middleweight World Grand Prix Championship
2005 Pride Middleweight World Grand Prix Semi-finalist
2006 Pride Openweight World Grand Prix Semi-finalist
Saku Championship belt winner
First Fighter in Pride Fighting Championships history to win a Pride Championship and Pride Grand Prix
Most wins in PRIDE FC history (22)
Longest undefeated streak in PRIDE FC history (20)
Most knockouts in PRIDE FC history (15)
Tied (Mirko Cro Cop) for most finishes in PRIDE FC history (16)
Most successful title defenses in PRIDE FC history (4)
Most successful title defenses in the history of PRIDE FC Middleweight division (4)
Most consecutive successful titles defenses in PRIDE FC history (4)
Most consecutive successful title defenses in the history of PRIDE FC Middleweight division (4)
International Vale Tudo Championship
IVC Light heavyweight Championship (One time)
Wrestling Observer Newsletter
2001 Feud of the Year 
2001 Most Outstanding Fighter
2003 Fight of the Year 
2004 Fight of the Year 
2004 Most Outstanding Fighter
Sports Illustrated
2004 Knockout of the Decade 
MMAFighting.com
2004 Light heavyweight of the Year
2013 Best Fight of the Half-Year 
Sherdog
2004 Fighter of the Year
Mixed Martial Arts Hall of Fame
World MMA Awards
2008 Fight of the Year vs. Chuck Liddell at UFC 79
2008 Knockout of the Year vs. Keith Jardine at UFC 84
2018 Lifetime Achievement

Mixed martial arts record

|-
|Loss
|align=center| (1)
|Quinton Jackson
|TKO (punches)
|Bellator 206
|
|align=center|2
|align=center|4:32
|San Jose, California, U.S.
|
|-
|Loss
|align=center|35–13–1 (1)
|Chael Sonnen
|Decision (unanimous)
|Bellator NYC
|
|align=center|3
|align=center|5:00
|New York City
|
|-
| Win
| align=center| 35–12–1 (1)
| Brian Stann
| KO (punches)
| UFC on Fuel TV: Silva vs. Stann
| 
| align=center| 2
| align=center| 4:08
| Saitama, Japan
| 
|-
| Loss
| align=center| 34–12–1 (1)
| Rich Franklin
| Decision (unanimous)
| UFC 147
| 
| align=center| 5
| align=center| 5:00
| Belo Horizonte, Brazil
|
|-
| Win
| align=center| 34–11–1 (1)
| Cung Le
| TKO (knees and punches)
| UFC 139
| 
| align=center| 2
| align=center| 4:49
| San Jose, California, U.S.
| 
|-
| Loss
| align=center| 33–11–1 (1)
| Chris Leben
| KO (punches)
| UFC 132
| 
| align=center| 1
| align=center| 0:27
| Las Vegas, Nevada, U.S.
|
|-
| Win
| align=center| 33–10–1 (1)
| Michael Bisping
| Decision (unanimous)
| UFC 110
| 
| align=center| 3
| align=center| 5:00
| Sydney, Australia
| 
|-
| Loss
| align=center| 32–10–1 (1)
| Rich Franklin
| Decision (unanimous)
| UFC 99
| 
| align=center| 3
| align=center| 5:00
| Cologne, Germany
| 
|-
| Loss
| align=center| 32–9–1 (1)
| Quinton Jackson
| KO (punch)
| UFC 92
| 
| align=center| 1
| align=center| 3:21
| Las Vegas, Nevada, U.S.
|
|-
| Win
| align=center| 32–8–1 (1)
| Keith Jardine
| KO (punches)
| UFC 84
| 
| align=center| 1
| align=center| 0:36
| Las Vegas, Nevada, U.S.
| 
|-
| Loss
| align=center| 31–8–1 (1)
| Chuck Liddell
| Decision (unanimous)
| UFC 79
| 
| align=center| 3
| align=center| 5:00
| Las Vegas, Nevada, U.S.
| 
|-
| Loss
| align=center| 31–7–1 (1)
| Dan Henderson
| KO (punches)
| Pride 33
| 
| align=center| 3
| align=center| 2:08
| Las Vegas, Nevada, U.S.
| 
|-
| Loss
| align=center| 31–6–1 (1)
| Mirko Cro Cop
| KO (head kick)
| Pride Final Conflict
| 
| align=center| 1
| align=center| 5:26
| Saitama, Japan
| 
|-
| Win
| align=center| 31–5–1 (1)
| Kazuyuki Fujita
| TKO (punches and soccer kicks)
| Pride Critical Countdown
| 
| align=center| 1
| align=center| 9:21
| Saitama, Japan
| 
|-
| Win
| align=center| 30–5–1 (1)
| Ricardo Arona
| Decision (split)
| Pride Shockwave 2005
| 
| align=center| 3
| align=center| 5:00
| Saitama, Japan
| 
|-
| Loss
| align=center| 29–5–1 (1)
| Ricardo Arona
| Decision (unanimous)
| Pride Final Conflict 2005
| 
| align=center| 2
| align=center| 5:00
| Saitama, Japan
| 
|-
| Win
| align=center| 29–4–1 (1)
| Kazuhiro Nakamura
| TKO (punches)
| Pride Critical Countdown 2005
| 
| align=center| 1
| align=center| 5:24
| Saitama, Japan
| 
|-
| Win
| align=center| 28–4–1 (1)
| Hidehiko Yoshida
| Decision (split)
| Pride Total Elimination 2005
| 
| align=center| 3
| align=center| 5:00
| Osaka, Japan
| 
|-
| Loss
| align=center| 27–4–1 (1)
| Mark Hunt
| Decision (split)
| Pride Shockwave 2004
| 
| align=center| 3
| align=center| 5:00
| Saitama, Japan
| 
|-
| Win
| align=center| 27–3–1 (1)
| Quinton Jackson
| KO (knees)
| Pride 28
| 
| align=center| 2
| align=center| 3:26
| Saitama, Japan
| 
|-
| Win
| align=center| 26–3–1 (1)
| Yuki Kondo
| KO (stomps)
| Pride Final Conflict 2004
| 
| align=center| 1
| align=center| 2:46
| Saitama, Japan
| 
|-
| Win
| align=center| 25–3–1 (1)
| Ikuhisa Minowa
| KO (punches)
| Pride Bushido 2
| 
| align=center| 1
| align=center| 1:09
| Yokohama, Japan
| 
|-
| Win
| align=center| 24–3–1 (1)
| Quinton Jackson
| TKO (knees)
| rowspan=2| Pride Final Conflict 2003
| rowspan=2| 
| align=center| 1
| align=center| 6:28
| rowspan=2| Tokyo, Japan
| 
|-
| Win
| align=center| 23–3–1 (1)
| Hidehiko Yoshida
| Decision (unanimous)
| align=center| 2
| align=center| 5:00
| 
|-
| Win
| align=center| 22–3–1 (1)
| Kazushi Sakuraba
| KO (punch)
| Pride Total Elimination 2003
| 
| align=center| 1
| align=center| 5:01
| Saitama, Japan
| 
|-
| Win
| align=center| 21–3–1 (1)
| Hiromitsu Kanehara
| TKO (corner stoppage)
| Pride 23
| 
| align=center| 1
| align=center| 3:40
| Tokyo, Japan
| 
|-
| Win
| align=center| 20–3–1 (1)
| Tatsuya Iwasaki
| TKO (head kick and punches)
| Pride Shockwave
| 
| align=center| 1
| align=center| 1:16
| Tokyo, Japan
| 
|-
| Draw
| align=center| 19–3–1 (1)
| Mirko Cro Cop
| Draw
| Pride 20
| 
| align=center| 5
| align=center| 3:00
| Yokohama, Japan
| 
|-
| Win
| align=center| 19–3 (1)
| Kiyoshi Tamura
| KO (punch)
| Pride 19
| 
| align=center| 2
| align=center| 2:28
| Saitama, Japan
| 
|-
| Win
| align=center| 18–3 (1)
| Alexander Otsuka
| TKO (doctor stoppage)
| Pride 18
| 
| align=center| 3
| align=center| 2:02
| Fukuoka, Japan
| 
|-
| Win
| align=center| 17–3 (1)
| Kazushi Sakuraba
| TKO (doctor stoppage)
| Pride 17
| 
| align=center| 1
| align=center| 10:00
| Tokyo, Japan
| 
|-
| Win
| align=center| 16–3 (1)
| Shungo Oyama
| TKO (punches)
| Pride 14 - Clash of the Titans
| 
| align=center| 1
| align=center| 0:30
| Yokohama, Japan
|
|-
| Win
| align=center| 15–3 (1)
| Kazushi Sakuraba
| TKO (knees and soccer kicks)
| Pride 13 - Collision Course
| 
| align=center| 1
| align=center| 1:38
| Saitama, Japan
|
|-
| Win
| align=center| 14–3 (1)
| Dan Henderson
| Decision (unanimous)
| Pride 12 - Cold Fury
| 
| align=center| 2
| align=center| 10:00
| Saitama, Japan
| 
|-
| NC
| align=center| 13–3 (1)
| Gilbert Yvel
| NC (Yvel kicked in groin)
| Pride 11 - Battle of the Rising Sun
| 
| align=center| 1
| align=center| 0:21
| Osaka, Japan
| 
|-
| Win
| align=center| 13–3
| Guy Mezger
| KO (punches)
| Pride 10 - Return of the Warriors
| 
| align=center| 1
| align=center| 3:45
| Saitama, Japan
|
|-
| Win
| align=center| 12–3
| Todd Medina
| KO (knees)
| Meca Vale Tudo 2
| 
| align=center| 1
| align=center| 0:39
| Curitiba, Brazil
|
|-
| Loss
| align=center| 11–3
| Tito Ortiz
| Decision (unanimous)
| UFC 25
| 
| align=center| 5
| align=center| 5:00
| Tokyo, Japan
| 
|-
| Win
| align=center| 11–2
| Bob Schrijber
| Submission (rear-naked choke)
| Pride Grand Prix 1st Round
| 
| align=center| 1
| align=center| 2:42
| Tokyo, Japan
|
|-
| Win
| align=center| 10–2
| Daijiro Matsui
| Decision (unanimous)
| Pride 8
| 
| align=center| 2
| align=center| 10:00
| Tokyo, Japan
|
|-
| Win
| align=center| 9–2
| Carl Malenko
| Decision (unanimous)
| Pride 7
| 
| align=center| 2
| align=center| 10:00
| Yokohama, Japan
|
|-
| Win
| align=center| 8–2
| Tony Petarra
| KO (knee)
| UFC 20
| 
| align=center| 1
| align=center| 2:53
| Birmingham, Alabama, U.S.
|
|-
| Win
| align=center| 7–2
| Eugene Jackson
| TKO (submission to punches)
| IVC 10: World Class Champions
| 
| align=center| 1
| align=center| 0:32
| Brazil
| 
|-
| Win
| align=center| 6–2
| Adrian Serrano
| KO (punches and kick)
| IVC 9: The Revenge
| 
| align=center| 1
| align=center| 0:22
| Aracaju, Brazil
|
|-
| Loss
| align=center| 5–2
| Vitor Belfort
| TKO (punches)
| UFC Brazil
| 
| align=center| 1
| align=center| 0:44
| São Paulo, Brazil
|
|-
| Win
| align=center| 5–1
| Mike van Arsdale
| KO (punch and kick)
| IVC 6: The Challenge
| 
| align=center| 1
| align=center| 4:00
| São Paulo, Brazil
|
|-
| Loss
| align=center| 4–1
| Artur Mariano
| TKO (doctor stoppage)
| rowspan=3|IVC 2: A Question of Pride
| rowspan=3| 
| align=center| 1
| align=center| 13:10
| rowspan=3|São Paulo, Brazil
| 
|-
| Win
| align=center| 4–0
| Egidio da Costa
| TKO (submission to punches)
| align=center| 1
| align=center| 2:27
|
|-
| Win
| align=center| 3–0
| Sean Bormet
| KO (kick)
| align=center| 1
| align=center| 1:19
|
|-
| Win
| align=center| 2–0
| Marcelao Barbosa
| TKO (shoulder injury)
| Brazilian Vale Tudo 10
| 
| align=center| 1
| align=center| 0:20
| Brazil
|
|-
| Win
| align=center| 1–0
| Dilson Filho
| KO (punch)
| Brazilian Vale Tudo 6
| 
| align=center| 1
| align=center| 3:35
| Brazil
|

Submission grappling record

Filmography

References

Books 
 Wanderlei Silva - Sem Coleira, BB Editora (8 October 2020),

External links

1976 births
Living people
Sportspeople from Curitiba
Brazilian male mixed martial artists
Brazilian sportspeople in doping cases
Doping cases in mixed martial arts
Middleweight mixed martial artists
Light heavyweight mixed martial artists
Mixed martial artists utilizing Muay Thai
Mixed martial artists utilizing Brazilian jiu-jitsu
Mixed martial arts trainers
Ultimate Fighting Championship male fighters
Pride Fighting Championships champions
Brazilian Muay Thai practitioners
Brazilian practitioners of Brazilian jiu-jitsu
People awarded a black belt in Brazilian jiu-jitsu
Brazilian expatriate sportspeople in the United States